Rex Huigens (born c. 1948) is a former American football and golf coach. He served as the head football coach at the University of La Verne in La Verne, California from 1991 to 1994, compiling a record of 30–6–1.  Huigens was also the head golf coach at La Verne.

Head coaching record

References

1940s births
Year of birth uncertain
Living people
La Verne Leopards football coaches
La Verne Leopards football players
La Verne Leopards men's basketball players
College golf coaches in the United States
American men's basketball players